Suzanne Thiollière (10 September 1924 – 6 June 1991) was a French alpine skier who competed in the 1948 Winter Olympics.

References

1924 births
1991 deaths
French female alpine skiers
Olympic alpine skiers of France
Alpine skiers at the 1948 Winter Olympics